Chérubin d'Orléans (1613-1697) was a French scientific instrument maker.

Biography
A Capucin father and distinguished physicist, Chérubin d'Orléans (François Lasséré) devoted himself to the study of optics and to vision-related problems, which he discussed in La dioptrique oculaire and La vision parfaite (Paris, 1671 and 1677 respectively). He developed a binocular telescope and he devised and may also have built a special type of eyepiece that replaced the lens with a short tube. Chérubin is also credited with producing models of the eyeball for studying the lens function of the eye. He also invented the stereo microscope, also called the dissecting microscope.

Works

References 
 Museo Galileo. "Chérubin d'Orléans". Catalog of the Museo Galileo's Instruments on Display. catalog .museogalileo.it

French scientific instrument makers